Cástaras is a municipality located in the province of Granada, Spain. According to the 2005 census (INE), the city has a population of 251 inhabitants.

References

External links 
Recuerdos de Cástaras- A complete web site with information, articles, photographies, links... related to this small village from La Alpujarra of Granada.

Municipalities in the Province of Granada